Zhao Wen Bei (pinyin: Zhào Wénbèi) is a Singapore based news anchor contracted under Mediacorp for Hello Singapore, News Tonight and Singapore Today.

Education
Zhao graduated from Communications University of China in 2002.

Career
Zhao used to be China's CCTV-4 news anchor in 2002. In 2005, Zhao left CCTV-4 and first joined MediaCorp Channel U, to be the news anchor of News World @ 11 《11点新闻》, News Jab @ 9 《9点新闻》 together with Tung Soo Hua, Zhang Haijie and Serene Loo. On the other hand, Zhao was also World This Week 《世界一周》's Current Affairs Presenter. 

In 2012, when MediaCorp Channel U and MediaCorp Channel 8 news group merge, Zhao was then News 8 at One 《1点新闻》, Hello Singapore 《狮城有约》, Singapore Today 《狮城6点半》 and News Tonight 《晚间新闻》 news anchor. When Zhao joined MediaCorp in 2005, she was nominated for Best News / Current Affairs Presenter in Star Awards 2006 right after a year, replacing Chun Guek Lay. 

Since 2006, Zhao was nominated for Best News / Currents Affairs Presenter in Star Awards 2007, Star Awards 2009. There wasn't any ceremony held on 2008, hence she wasn't nominated. In Star Awards 2010, Star Awards 2011, Star Awards 2012, Star Awards 2013 she was nominated for Best News Presenter. Zhao managed to win the Best News Presenters award in 2010 and 2013.

Personal life 
Zhao gave birth to a son in 2014.

Awards and nominations

References

1979 births
Living people
Singaporean television personalities